Aldin Turkeš (born 22 April 1996) is a professional footballer who plays as a forward for Swiss Super League club Lausanne-Sport.

Turkeš started his professional career at Zürich, before joining Vaduz in 2016. Two years later, he was loaned to Rapperswil-Jona, with whom he signed permanently later that year. The following year, he moved to Lausanne-Sport.

Club career

Early career
Turkeš started playing football at Luzern, before joining Grasshopper's youth academy in 2013. Two years later, he moved to Zürich's youth setup. He made his professional debut against Young Boys on 27 February 2016 at the age of 19.

In August 2016, he switched to Vaduz. He scored his first professional goal on 28 May 2017.

In January 2018, Turkeš was sent on a six-month loan to Rapperswil-Jona. In July, he joined the team permanently. Turkeš scored his first career hat-trick against Kriens on 28 July.

On 26 June 2019, he signed with Lausanne-Sport. In December 2020, he suffered a severe knee injury, which was diagnosed as anterior cruciate ligament tear and was ruled out for at least six months.

International career
Despite representing Switzerland on various youth levels, Turkeš decided to play for Bosnia and Herzegovina on senior level.

In September 2018, his application to change sports citizenship from Swiss to Bosnian was approved by FIFA. He was first part of Bosnia and Herzegovina under-21 team.

In October 2020, he received his first senior call-up, for friendly game against Iran and 2020–21 UEFA Nations League games against Netherlands and Italy.

Career statistics

Club

Honours
Zürich
Swiss Cup: 2015–16

Vaduz
Liechtenstein Cup: 2016–17

Lausanne-Sport
Swiss Challenge League: 2019–20

Individual

Performances
Swiss Challenge League Top Goalscorer: 2019–20

References

External links

1996 births
Living people
People from Zug
Sportspeople from the canton of Zug
Swiss people of Bosnia and Herzegovina descent
Citizens of Bosnia and Herzegovina through descent
Swiss men's footballers
Switzerland youth international footballers
Bosnia and Herzegovina footballers
Bosnia and Herzegovina under-21 international footballers
Bosnia and Herzegovina expatriate footballers
Association football forwards
FC Zürich players
FC Vaduz players
Swiss expatriate footballers
Expatriate footballers in Liechtenstein
FC Rapperswil-Jona players
FC Lausanne-Sport players
Swiss Super League players
Swiss Challenge League players
Bosnia and Herzegovina expatriate sportspeople in Switzerland